The Speaking Canaries (sometimes "Thee Speaking Canaries" or "The(e) Speaking Canaries") are an indie rock group from Pittsburgh, Pennsylvania.  They are known for being Don Caballero drummer Damon Che's "other band", and for their unabashed love of the kind of 1970s and '80s hard rock purveyed by bands such as KISS and Rush -- indeed, the Canaries' second album Songs for the Terrestrially Challenged features covers of two Van Halen songs.

Original Lineup (1991-1995)
Damon Che - guitar, vocals
Karl Hendricks - bass, vocals
Noah Leger - drums

Current Lineup (2004-present)
Damon Che - guitar, vocals
Adam Crane - bass
Eugene Doyle - drums

Discography
The Joy of Wine (1993) LP on Mind Cure Records
Songs for the Terrestrially Challenged (hi-fi version) (1995) Double LP / CD on Scat Records
Songs for the Terrestrially Challenged (low-fi version) (1995) Double LP on Mind Cure Records
The Opponents (1996) 12" EP on Scat Records
Life-Like Homes (1998) LP on Scat Records
Get Out Alive: The Last Type Story (2003) LP / CD on Scat Records
Get Out Alive: The Long Version (2003) CD-R on Scat Records

References

Indie rock musical groups from Pennsylvania
Musical groups from Pittsburgh
Scat Records artists